Bucklow may refer to:

Bucklow (hundred), formerly a division of Cheshire, England
Bucklow Hill, a village in Cheshire, England
Bucklow Rural District, formerly a local government district in Cheshire
Bucklow (UK Parliament constituency), formerly a constituency in Cheshire
Bucklow (ward), a former electoral ward of Trafford, Greater Manchester (1973–2004)
Bucklow-St. Martins, an electoral ward of Trafford, Greater Manchester
Christopher Bucklow (born 1957), British photographer and painter

See also